The 2004 Gateshead Borough Council election was held on 10 June 2004 to elect members of Gateshead Council in Tyne and Wear, England. The whole council was up for election with boundary changes since the last election in 2003. The Labour Party stayed in overall control of the council.

Campaign

The boundary changes kept the number of wards and seats on the council unchanged while changing many of the wards. In total 216 candidates stood in the election, with the Labour and Conservative parties standing for all of the seats. The Liberal Democrats stood in all but two wards where the Liberal Party stood instead. There were also 17 British National Party candidates and one Independent.

The council was expected to remain under Labour control as it had been for the previous 30 years but the Liberal Democrats hoped to make gains. Labour called on voters to re-elect them in order to keep the services provided by the council improving. The Liberal Democrats claimed that a local maternity unit and library were under threat of being closed but Labour accused them of scaremongering. Local businessman Sir John Hall called on voters to re-elect the Labour council in order that a partnership with Newcastle council could continue.

Printing problems meant that ballot papers for the election, which was held with all postal voting, were about a week late in being sent out with 150,000 ballots having to be reprinted. As a result, extra printers were used and ballot boxes were placed in local libraries.

Election result

Resulting Council Composition

Ward results

References

2004 English local elections
2004
21st century in Tyne and Wear